The 2019 South and Central American Men's Youth Handball Championship was the first edition of the tournament, took place in Taubaté, Brazil at the Ginásio EMECAL, from 8 to 12 May 2019. It acted as the South and Central American qualifying tournament for the 2019 Men's Youth World Handball Championship.

Standings

Results
All times are local (UTC–3).

References

External links
Brazilian Handball Federation website

South and Central American Men's Youth Handball Championship
South and Central American Men's Youth Handball Championship
South and Central American Men's Youth Handball Championship
South and Central American Men's Youth Handball Championship
South and Central American Men's Youth Handball Championship
Taubaté